The 1916 United States presidential election in Alabama took place on November 7, 1916, as part of the nationwide presidential election. State voters chose 12 representatives, or electors, to the Electoral College, who voted for president and vice president.

Alabama was won by incumbent President Woodrow Wilson (D–New Jersey), running with incumbent Vice President Thomas R. Marshall, with 75.6% of the popular vote, against Associate Justice of the U.S. Supreme Court Charles Evans Hughes (R–New York), running with former Vice President Charles W. Fairbanks, with 21.9% of the popular vote.

Results

See also
United States presidential elections in Alabama

References

Notes

Alabama
1916
1916 Alabama elections